Carlos Banda (born 28 March 1978) is a Chilean-Swedish football manager. He is the manager of Assyriska FF.

Banda played his highest level of football in then fourth tier team FC Café Opera, before he retired from football as a player due to a groin injury he had in 1999. 
He began coaching youth teams of IF Brommapojkarna and moved on to Stockholm rival Hammarby IF in 2003, to coach in Hammarby's youth organization.

Banda signed on for his first senior team Djurgården on 3 December 2009. Along with co-manager Lennart Wass, Banda led his team to a tenth position in the 2010 Allsvenskan. He stayed with Djurgården as an assistant coach to new manager Magnus Pehrsson until July 2012. 

He then returned to Hammarby where he again was assigned the role of assistant manager. A position Banda held during the reigns of three managers: Gregg Berhalter, Thomas Dennerby and Nanne Bergstrand. Ultimately he left Hammarby by mutual consent in June 2016 after four years at the club.

Personal life
Born in Chile, Banda emigrated to Sweden when he was a child and returned to his country of birth in 1994, having a trial with Universidad Católica thanks to the coach Gino Valentini, who is a friend of his uncle. Then, he returned to Sweden.

He has gone to Chile to give some football talks.

References

1978 births
Living people
Chilean footballers
Chilean expatriate footballers
Naturalized citizens of Sweden
Swedish footballers
AFC Eskilstuna players
Association football defenders
Chilean football managers
Chilean expatriate football managers
Swedish football managers
Djurgårdens IF Fotboll managers
Hammarby Fotboll non-playing staff
IF Brommapojkarna non-playing staff
Assyriska FF managers
Vasalunds IF managers
Place of birth missing (living people)